Budd Lake is a lake in the Tuolumne Meadows region of Yosemite National Park, United States. Budd Lake is the source of Budd Creek.

Budd Lake was named for James Budd, 19th Governor of California.

See also

Near Budd Lake
 Cathedral Peak, a mountain fairly near Budd Lake
 Cockscomb, another mountain fairly near Budd Lake
 Echo Peaks, mountains near Budd Lake
 Elizabeth Lake, also fairly near Budd Lake
 Matthes Crest, a mountain which is near Budd Lake
 Unicorn Peak, a mountain which is near Budd Lake

General references

 List of lakes in California

References

External links and references

 A topographic map of the area
 A hiker passes through the area
 More notes on Budd Lake
 Mentions Budd Lake's elevation

Lakes of Tuolumne County, California
Lakes of Yosemite National Park